William A. "Sonny" Hoffman was a professional baseball player. He played in two games for the 1879 Cleveland Blues.
He also liked horse racing and made a lot of big bets. Soon after his last baseball game he disappeared and nobody knows what happened to him. He was never heard from again.

External links

1853 births
Year of death missing
Major League Baseball catchers
Major League Baseball outfielders
Cleveland Blues (NL) players
Minneapolis Browns players
Baseball players from Cleveland
19th-century baseball players